Borzu (also Romanized as Borzū, Barzu, and Berzū) is a village in Qasabeh-ye Gharbi Rural District, in the Central District of Sabzevar County, Razavi Khorasan Province, Iran. At the 2006 census, its population was 852, in 230 families.

References 

Populated places in Sabzevar County